Sing, Dance, Plenty Hot is a 1940 American comedy film directed by Lew Landers and written by Gordon Rigby and Bradford Ropes. The film stars Ruth Terry, Johnny Downs, Barbara Jo Allen, Billy Gilbert, Claire Carleton and Mary Lee. The film was released on August 10, 1940, by Republic Pictures.

Plot

Cast 
Ruth Terry as Irene
Johnny Downs as Johnny
Barbara Jo Allen as Susan
Billy Gilbert as Hector
Claire Carleton as Evelyn
Mary Lee as Judy
Elisabeth Risdon as Agatha
Lester Matthews as Scott
Leonard Carey as Henderson

References

External links
 

1940 films
American comedy films
1940 comedy films
Republic Pictures films
Films directed by Lew Landers
Films scored by William Lava
American black-and-white films
1940s English-language films
1940s American films